Dawn is the third Danger Danger album in order of release, though it isn't the third to be recorded. It features Bruno Ravel on guitar as well as bass.

On this album, the band went in a very different direction musically, lyrically and image-wise from its previous albums. It can loosely be compared to Warrant's Ultraphobic, which was also released in 1995.

This album was released in place of Cockroach, which was scheduled for a 1993 release. However, Ted Poley sought legal action, preventing the album's release.

Bassist Scott Brown, who had previously played with Paul Laine as a solo artist, played bass for the tour for Dawn, though he didn't play on the actual album.

Track listing
All tracks by Paul Laine & Bruno Ravel

 "Helicopter" – 4:58
 "Crawl" – 4:53
 "Punching Bag" – 4:58
 "Mother Mercy" – 4:32
 "Sorry" – 5:22
 "Drivin' Sideways" – 3:48
 "Goodbye" – 3:51
 "Wide Awake And Dead" – 6:12
 "Nobody Cares" – 4:37
 "Heaven's Fallin'" – 5:44
 "Hard" – 5:30

Personnel 
Paul Laine – lead vocals, Hammond B-3 organ, acoustic guitar, percussion
Bruno Ravel – lead and rhythm guitars, backing vocals, keyboards, bass
Steve West – drums, percussion

References

1995 albums
Danger Danger albums